"Marigot Bay" is a song recorded in 1980 by the German disco group Arabesque. It is the title track from the band's studio album of the same name. It was released as a single in late 1980. It is most notable for being the group's first and only song to reach the Top 10 in their native country. It peaked at Number 8 for 22 weeks in West Germany and at Number 17 for 4 weeks in Austria.

Sandra Ann Lauer sings the lead vocal in this pop song about lost love in the Caribbean beaches of Marigot Bay.

Track listing
 A. "Marigot Bay" - 3:50
 B. "Hey, Catch On" - 3:20

Charts

Weekly charts

Year-end charts

References

1980 songs
1980 singles
Arabesque (group) songs